Inferno, in comics, may refer to:

Inferno (DC Comics), a character from the DC Comics series Legion of Super-Heroes
Inferno (Mighty Crusaders), a character from DC's time leasing the Mighty Crusaders licence
Inferno,  the name of an alternate version of Legion of Super-Heroes member Sun Boy
Inferno (Marvel Comics), a 1989 storyline between Marvel Comics titles in which the X-Men battled demons
Inferno, a number of characters in Marvel Comics:
Inferno (demon), the name of a demon in appearing in Marvel Comics as an enemy of Ghost Rider
Inferno (Joseph Conroy), an opponent of the Avengers
Inferno (Samantha McGee), a member of the Exemplars
Inferno (Dante Pertuz), an Inhuman with the ability to light himself aflame
Inferno!, a Warhammer anthology magazine mixing text and comic stories
"Inferno", a Judge Dredd story written by Grant Morrison
Inferno (Caliber Comics), a title from Caliber Comics
Inferno (Image Comics), a character from Image Comics and member of the Vicious Circle

See also
Inferno (disambiguation)
Armageddon: Inferno, a DC Comics storyline connected with Armageddon 2001

References